Natwar Gandhi is an American accountant, and was chief financial officer, for the District of Columbia, from 2007 to 2013.

Biography 
Gandhi was born in Mumbai, India.

He graduated from University of Bombay, Atlanta University, and Louisiana State University. He started to work in 1957. He was special assistant to Jim Florio. He was assistant professor of accounting at the University of Pittsburgh. From 1976 until 1998, he was an adjunct professor at American University, Georgetown University, and the University of Maryland.

He was the chief financial officer, for the District of Columbia, from 2007 to 2013. In October 2012, SEC has launched an inquiry into audits handled by the D.C. Office of the Chief Financial Officer, requesting all reports from the office's internal affairs unit dating to January 2010. The Washington Post story highlighted that "Gandhi has come under intense scrutiny in recent weeks because of his long-standing policy of keeping the audits out of public view".

In 2019, Gandhi published his autobiography Still the Promised Land.

Social work 
Gandhi is on the board of Shakespeare Theatre Company, Arena Stage, and Gallaudet University.

Works 
 Still the Promised Land I-Lead, Incorporated, 2019.

References

External links 
 Natwar Gandhi's public appearances

Year of birth missing (living people)
Living people
American accountants
American chief financial officers
Atlanta University alumni
Government of the District of Columbia
Louisiana State University alumni
People from Mumbai
University of Mumbai alumni
University of Pittsburgh faculty